Al Manning (born 14 February 1982) is a rugby union player for the New South Wales Waratahs in the Super Rugby competition. He plays as a hooker.

References

External links
Waratahs profile
Go the Tahs profile

1982 births
Living people
Australian rugby union players
Rugby union hookers
New South Wales Waratahs players